Sebastian Smee is an Australian-born Pulitzer Prize-winning art critic for the Washington Post.

Education and career
Educated at St Peter's College, Adelaide, Smee graduated from the University of Sydney with an Honours degree in fine arts in 1994 and moved to Boston in 2008, having also lived in the United Kingdom between 2001 and 2004. Before joining The Boston Globe he was national art critic for The Australian and has also worked for The Daily Telegraph and contributed to The Guardian, The Times, The Financial Times, The Independent on Sunday, The Art Newspaper, Modern Painters, Prospect magazine and The Spectator.

He won the 2011 Pulitzer Prize for Criticism for his "vivid and exuberant writing about art, often bringing great works to life with love and appreciation".

In 2015, after Smee criticized the "Renoir Sucks at Painting" protest at the Museum of Fine Arts Boston, Max Geller - the leader of the movement - challenged Smee to a duel in the Boston Commons.

Works
Smee is the author of the books Lucian Freud and Side by Side: Picasso v Matisse. In 2016, The Art of Rivalry was published. The book examines the relationships between four pairs of artists — Matisse and Picasso, de Kooning and Pollock, Freud and Bacon, and Degas and Manet.

Smee is author of the 72nd issue of the Quarterly Essay titled "Net Loss: The Inner Life in the Digital Age" (2018).

Publications
Sebastian Smee, Side by Side: Picasso v Matisse, Duffy and Snellgrove, 
_, Lucian Freud, Taschen, 2007, 
_, The Art of Rivalry: Four Friendships, Betrayals, and Breakthroughs in Modern Art, Profile Books, 2016, 
Anita Hill, Sebastian Smee, Cornelia Butler, Mark Bradford, Phaidon Press, London, 2018,

References

External links 
 Official website

Australian art critics
Australian journalists
The Boston Globe people
Pulitzer Prize for Criticism winners
Living people
University of Sydney alumni
Year of birth missing (living people)